Pezicula (syn. Ocellaria) is a genus of fungi in the family Dermateaceae. It was first described by the brothers Charles and Louis René Tulasne in 1865.  The genus contains 37 species.

See also
 List of Dermateaceae genera

References

External links
Pezicula at Index Fungorum

Dermateaceae genera